Hechtia glomerata, commonly known as guapilla, is a species of bromeliad that is native to southern Texas in the United States, Mexico, and Guatemala.

Cultivars
 Hechtia 'Ventura' (H. marnier-lapostollei × H. glomerata)

References

External links
US Department of Agriculture plants profile
Lady Bird Johnson Wildflower Center, University of Texas
Dave's Garden plant files
Eagle Eye Adventures, Stoloniferous Hechtia glomerata in Queretaro 

glomerata
Plants described in 1838
Flora of Guatemala
Flora of Mexico
Flora of Texas